Sona is a comune with a population of 14,269 in the province of Verona in Italy with an area of .

Physical Geography
The municipality of Sona, which is located about halfway between Verona, from which it is 13.5 km away, and the Lake Garda, borders to the Bussolengo to the north, Verona to the east, Sommacampagna to the south, Valeggio sul Mincio to the southwest, and Castelnuovo del Garda to the northwest. The municipal territory, which develops for a large part between the morainic hills of the bottom, formed by the glacier sliding towards the valley that gave way to Lake Garda, develops between 83 meters of the flat portion of the territory and 240 meters of the higher hill. high, while the Town Hall rises 169 meters.

Twin towns
Sona is twinned with:

  Wadowice (Lesser Poland, Poland) 
   Weiler-Simmerberg (Bavaria, Germany)

References

External links

Cities and towns in Veneto